Maravilha (Portuguese for wonder) may refer to:

Places
 Maravilha, Alagoas, municipality in Alagoas, Brazil
 Maravilha, Santa Catarina, municipality in Santa Catarina, Brazil
 Maravilhas, municipality in Minas Gerais, Brazil
 Maravilha Environmental Protection Area, municipal environmental protection area in Rio de Janeiro, Brazil

People
 Maravilha (footballer) (born 1973), Marlisa Wahlbrink, Brazilian women's football goalkeeper
 Elke Maravilha (1945-2016), German-Brazilian actress
 Fio Maravilha (born 1945), João Batista de Sales, Brazilian football forward
 Dadá Maravilha (born 1946), Dario José dos Santos, Brazilian football forward
 Túlio Maravilha (born 1969), Túlio Humberto Pereira Costa, Brazilian football forward
 Bonde das Maravilhas, Brazilian all-female funk group

Other uses
 Feijão Maravilha, 1979 Brazilian telenovela

See also
 Maravilla (disambiguation)